The following lists events that happened during 2014 in Chad.

Incumbents
 President: Idriss Déby
 Prime Minister: Kalzeubet Pahimi Deubet

Events

May
 May 17 - Nigeria, Niger, Cameroon, Benin, and Chad unite to combat Boko Haram.

August
 August 17 - Chadian troops rescue 85 hostages from Boko Haram who had been kidnapped in Nigeria and taken over the border into Chad.

December
 December 22 - Chad abstains placing North Korea's human rights record on the United Nations Security Council's agenda.

References

 
Years of the 21st century in Chad
2010s in Chad
Chad
Chad